Pseudagrion vumbaense is a species of damselfly in the family Coenagrionidae. It is endemic to Zimbabwe.  Its natural habitats are subtropical or tropical moist montane forests and rivers. It is threatened by habitat loss.

References

Insects of Zimbabwe
Coenagrionidae
Endemic fauna of Zimbabwe
Insects described in 1963
Taxa named by Boris Balinsky
Taxonomy articles created by Polbot